Oldřichov v Hájích is a municipality and village in Liberec District in the Liberec Region of the Czech Republic. It has about 800 inhabitants.

Administrative parts
The village of Filipka is an administrative part of Oldřichov v Hájích.

History
The first written mention of Oldřichov v Hájích is from 1381.

Twin towns – sister cities

Oldřichov v Hájích is twinned with:
 Gozdnica, Poland

References

External links

Villages in Liberec District